Georgy Nadzharyan is a Russian Paralympic footballer who won a silver medal at the 2008 Summer Paralympics in China.

References

External links
 
 Photos of Georgy Nadzharyan

20th-century births
Year of birth missing (living people)
Living people
Paralympic 7-a-side football players of Russia
Paralympic silver medalists for Russia
Paralympic medalists in football 7-a-side
7-a-side footballers at the 2008 Summer Paralympics
Medalists at the 2008 Summer Paralympics
21st-century Russian people